Kajberunik (Armenian: Քաջբերունիք, Աղիովիտ, English: Aghiovit, Qajberuniq, Kajberunik, Russian: Каджберуник) was a historical Armenian canton (Armenian: գավառ / gavar) on a northern shore of Lake Van – located in the eastern Turuberan province, which became known as the Kajberuni princely family's territory. The canton is also known as Arjesh or Arjisho country forenames, which included Irishat and Ororan (Archesh) rivers.

History

5th century
Kajberunik was part of the Arshakuni Kingdom until its fall in the year 428 AD and was known as a resting area for the younger members of the royal family. Kajberuniq was later integrated in Turuberan Province under the Greater Armenian Kingdom of Bagratuni. The Kajberuni princely family contributed arms and warriors in the Battle of Avarayr against the Persians in 451 AD under the leadership of Nerseh Kajberuni – who was killed during the battle along with seven other members of the family.

7th century
Kajberunik canton was ultimately conquered by the caliphate (in the 9th century the province was integrated into the Kaysik's empire), following an entry into the Kingdom of Vaspurakan. The canton eventually fell under the Byzantine Empire's rule in the year 1021 AD.

9th century
Kajberunik was overrun by the Seljuk Turks. Later in the succession, the province was conquered by the Shah Armenns, the Eyubyannere, and the Mongols. In 850 Grigor Kajberuni joined forces of Bagrat II Bagratuniin his failed rebellion against the Abbasid caliph.

16th–17th centuries
Kajberuniq was affected by the Turkish-Persian war. In the beginning of the 17th century, the Persian Shah Abbas Ist relocated thousands of Armenians from Kajberuniq into Persia. Under the conventions of Amasia (1555 AD) and Kasre-Shirin (1639 AD) the control over Kajberuniq province was transferred over to the Ottoman Empire, which became known as the Arjesh province of Van.

19th century
Lake Van's water level increased in the year 1841 AD, which resulted in the destruction of the city of Arjesh. The village-town of Akants became the administrative center for the region following the destruction of Arjesh. About twenty-six thousand Armenians suffered heavy losses in the province during the Hamidian massacres of 1896 AD.

20th century
On the eve of the First World War, around Ten to Fifteen thousand Armenians lived in the canton of Kajberuniq – mainly engaged in grain, horticulture, crafts and fishing industries. Significant portion of the population residing in the Kajberuniq province were massacred during the Armenian genocide in 1915. Genocide survivors escaped the canton and found refuge in Eastern Armenia.

Shurishkan Gospel
In 1498, Turvanda prince of Vaspurakan requested T. Barsegh priest of Aspisnak village of Kajberuniq canton, to make a copy of the gospel – which later became known as Shurishan. It was difficult to imagine at the time that this manuscript will be highly admired and cherished by the Armenians of the region. Persian king Shah Abbas forcefully relocated thousands of Armenians from the Lake Van area into Persia in 17th century – the book was carefully carried to Peria, which was the most Armenian populated province of Persia at the time.

Nerses Kajberuni

Nerses Kajberuni was a priest from Payazit (Old Bayazet). He escaped Ottoman Empire during the Genocide and started his family in Yerevan, Armenia. Nerses Kajberuni was executed by the Communist Party members in 1937 because of his religious affiliation.

References

Former regions of Armenia